Soluk (also Romanized as Solūk) is a village in Soluk Rural District, in the Central District of Hashtrud County, East Azerbaijan Province, Iran. At the 2006 census, its population was 630, in 143 families.

References 

Towns and villages in Hashtrud County